Shilpi Somaya Gowda is the award-winning, New York Times and internationally bestselling Canadian author of Secret Daughter, The Golden Son, and The Shape of Family. She  lives in California with her family. 

She was born in 1970 and raised in Toronto, Ontario, Canada. In college, she spent a summer as a volunteer in an Indian orphanage, which seeded the idea for her first novel, Secret Daughter, published in 2010. It was a New York Times and #1 international bestseller, and was translated into over 30 languages. Secret Daughter was shortlisted for the South African Boeke Literary Prize, longlisted for the IMPAC Dublin Literary Award,  was an IndieNext Great Read, a Target Book Club Pick, a ChaptersIndigo Heather's Pick, and an Amnesty International Book Club Pick.

Her second novel, The Golden Son, was published in 2015-16 around the world, was a #1 international bestseller, a Target Book Club Pick, a Costco Buyer's Pick, and was awarded the French literary prize, Prix des Lyceens Folio. Her first two novels have sold over two million copies worldwide, and her third novel, The Shape of Family, was published in October 2019 in Canada and March 2020 in the U.S.

Education 
Gowda holds an MBA from Stanford University, and a bachelor's degree in Economics from the University of North Carolina at Chapel Hill, where she was a Morehead-Cain scholar. She has served on the Advisory Board of the Children's Defense Fund, and is a Patron of Childhaven International, the organization for which she volunteered in India.

Career

Novels

Secret Daughter 
Gowda's debut novel was published by HarperCollins/William Morrow in 2010 and became a New York Times bestseller and a #1 international bestseller. It was translated into more than 30 languages and became a bestseller in several foreign countries, in addition to the US and Canada. The story was inspired by Gowda's experience volunteering at an orphanage in India during a summer in college, and explores the repercussions of female infanticide that is prevalent in many parts of Asia. It features a girl born in an Indian village, unwanted because of her gender, who is later adopted by a professional couple in California. The novel traces the lives of the girl, both her biological and her adoptive families over two decades.

The Washington Post said of the novel, A nuanced coming-of-age story that is faithful to the economic and emotional realities of two very different cultures. ... As the author moves among the perspectives of her various characters, she gives full weight to the humanity of each and views the problems of poverty and affluence with equal empathy. ... Gowda doesn't neaten up the messy complications of family life as she warmly affirms the power of love to help people grow and change.

Secret Daughter was shortlisted for the South African Boeke Literary Prize, longlisted for the IMPAC Dublin Literary Award,  was an IndieNext Great Read, a Target Book Club Pick, a ChaptersIndigo Heather's Pick, and an Amnesty International Book Club Pick.

The Golden Son 
Gowda's second novel was published in 2015-16 around the world, and it too became a #1 international bestseller. The story features two childhood friends who grow up in the same village in India, but whose paths diverge when Anil goes to America to pursue his dream of becoming a doctor, while Leena moves to a neighboring village to have an arranged marriage.

Marisa de los Santos, New York Times bestselling author of Belong to Me and The Precious One, commented on The Golden Son, saying, Shilpi Somaya Gowda "is as adept at crafting disparate, fully realized worlds—a village in India, a medical school in Texas—as she is at creating compelling characters. I ached and cheered for Leena and Anil, as they struggle to live lives of their own choosing amidst the demands of tradition and the sometimes beautiful, sometimes painful bonds of family."

The Shape of Family 
Gowda's third novel will be published, again by HarperCollins/William Morrow. It is currently scheduled for release on 10/15/2019 in Canada, 3/17/2020 in the US, and dates to come in several other countries. The Shape of Family has been listed as a "Most Anticipated Book" by CBC Books, Chatelaine Magazine, ChaptersIndigo, Philadelphia Inquirer, Library Journal and Vancouver Public Library.

Awards

Secret Daughter 
 Long-listed for the IMPAC Dublin International Literary Award
 Short-listed for the South African Boeke Literary Prize
 Amnesty International Book Club Selection (2015)
 IndieNEXT Great Read, April 2010 (American Booksellers' Association)
 Target Club Pick (April 2011)
 ChaptersIndigo -Heather's Pick
 Amazon Customer Favorite & Editor's Choice of 2010
 Vancouver Sun (Top 10 Books of 2010)
 #1 Bestselling Book of 2010 in Canada
 Bestseller Lists: USA (New York Times, USA Today, IndieBound), Canada, Norway, Germany, Israel, Poland, Malaysia

The Golden Son 
 Winner of the French literary prize Prix des Lyceens Folio
 USA Today bestseller list
 #1 on the Canadian Fiction bestseller list in both of Canada's national newspapers (Globe & Mail and Toronto Star)

References

External links 
 

Living people
1970 births
Canadian women novelists
21st-century Canadian novelists
21st-century Canadian women writers
Indian women novelists
Stanford University alumni
University of North Carolina at Chapel Hill alumni